Gyöngyös is a district in central-western part of Heves County. Gyöngyös is also the name of the town where the district seat is found. The district is located in the Northern Hungary Statistical Region. This district is a part of Mátra Mountains geographical region.

Geography 
Gyöngyös District borders with Bátonyterenye District (Nógrád County) and Pétervására District to the north, Eger District, Füzesabony District and Heves District to the east, Jászberény District (Jász-Nagykun-Szolnok County) to the south, Hatvan District and Pásztó District (Nógrád County) to the west. The number of the inhabited places in Gyöngyös District is 24.

Municipalities 
The district has 2 towns and 22 villages.
(ordered by population, as of 1 January 2012)

The bolded municipalities are cities.

Demographics

In 2011, it had a population of 73,834 and the population density was 98/km².

Ethnicity
Besides the Hungarian majority, the main minorities are the Roma (approx. 4,000), Slovak (400), German (300) and Romanian (150).

Total population (2011 census): 73,834
Ethnic groups (2011 census): Identified themselves: 70,115 persons:
Hungarians: 65,039 (92.76%)
Gypsies: 3,564 (5.08%)
Others and indefinable: 1,512 (2.16%)
Approx. 3,500 persons in Gyöngyös District did not declare their ethnic group at the 2011 census.

Religion
Religious adherence in the county according to 2011 census:

Catholic – 39,722 (Roman Catholic – 39,490; Greek Catholic – 225);
Reformed – 2,675;
Evangelical – 214; 
other religions – 1,082; 
Non-religious – 10,725; 
Atheism – 891;
Undeclared – 18,525.

Gallery

See also
List of cities and towns of Hungary

References

External links
 Postal codes of the Gyöngyös District

Further reading
Gyöngyös, Hungary KehilaLink

Districts in Heves County